Portballintrae is a small seaside village in County Antrim, Northern Ireland. It is four miles east of Portrush and two miles west of the Giant's Causeway. In the 2001 Census it had a population of 734 people, a decline of 10% compared to 1991. It lies within the Causeway Coast and Glens District Council area.

History

Donald Trump
In 2007 Portballintrae was considered as a location for a proposed £1 billion golf course complex by American tycoon and former American president Donald Trump.

Spanish Armada

Between 1967 and April 1968 a team of Belgian divers (including Robert Sténuit, the world's first aquanaut), located the remains of the wreck of the Girona off the coast of Portballintrae and brought up the greatest find of Spanish Armada treasure salvaged up until that time. The recovered artefacts are now on display in the Ulster Museum in Belfast.

Places of interest

The ruins of Dunluce Castle sit on the edge of a cliff between Portballintrae and Portrush. The castle was the main stronghold of the MacDonnell chiefs of Antrim.
Much of Portballintrae and its surrounding area is owned by the Macnaghten family of Dundarave House and Runkerry House.  Runkerry, once the home of Lord Macnaghten, has since been converted into a series of apartments.
The Giant's Causeway Tramway runs through the sand dunes above the largest beach in Portballintrae, commonly known as Runkerry Strand, and Bushfoot Golf Club.  This railway, popular with tourists, runs between The Giants Causeway and Bushmills.

2001 Census
Portballintrae is classified as a small village or hamlet by the NI Statistics and Research Agency (NISRA) (i.e. with population between 500 and 1,000 people).
On Census day (29 April 2001) there were 734 people living in Portballintrae. Of these:
12.0% were aged under 16 years and 33.4% were aged 60 and over
48.9% of the population were male and 51.1% were female
1.0% were from a Catholic background and 96.5% were from a Protestant background. 
2.1% of people aged 16–74 were unemployed

References

Coleraine Borough Council
Draft Northern Area Plan 2016

External links
Portballintrae website
Portballintrae.net
NI Neighbourhood Information Service

Villages in County Antrim
Seaside resorts in Northern Ireland
Beaches of Northern Ireland